The Little Giant is an album by jazz saxophonist Johnny Griffin and his all-star sextet, released on the Riverside label in 1959. It was Griffin's third album on Riverside.

"The Little Giant" was Griffin's nickname.

Track listing
"Olive Refractions" (Norman Simmons) - 4:17
"The Message" (Simmons) - 7:24
"Lonely One" (Babs Gonzales) 4:09
"63rd Street Theme" (Griffin) - 7:35
"Playmates" (Saxie Dowell) - 4:19
"Venus and the Moon" (Simmons) - 6:32

Personnel
Johnny Griffin - tenor saxophone
Blue Mitchell - trumpet
Julian Priester - trombone
Wynton Kelly - piano
Sam Jones - bass
Albert "Tootie" Heath - drums

References 

1959 albums
Wynton Kelly albums
Blue Mitchell albums
Johnny Griffin albums